The British Indian Psychiatric Association (a.k.a. bipa or B.I.P.A) is a non-profitable charitable association founded in 1995 by Indian psychiatrists working in United Kingdom. It currently has 400 psychiatrists of all grades working in NHS and Private sector. In 2010 there are around 2000 psychiatrists of Indian Origin working as psychiatrists in National Health Service Organization out of which a small proportion   work in Private Sector also. This association was born out of necessity to address mentoring needs of fellow trainee psychiatrists and grew over the years serving several other purposes . The main purpose of BIPA was to establish links with other diaspora organizations in  the same field of psychiatry . The association became a UK registered charity in the year xx/xx

List of past Presidents / Secretaries :

List of achievements :

Current Executive Council :

Current Mission and Vision statements :

Mental health organisations in the United Kingdom
1995 establishments in the United Kingdom
Organizations established in 1995
Diaspora organisations in the United Kingdom
Overseas Indian organisations